Rita Bertha Maria Demeester (26 September 1946 – 29 January 1993) was a Belgian poet and writer.

Biography
She was born at Roeselare. She obtained a degree in social pedagogy from the Catholic University of Leuven. She worked as an educationalist, but started writing when she became unemployed in 1986. Demeester died at Genk in 1993.

Awards
 1989 - Rabobank Lenteprijs voor Literatuur for In het spoor van Jim Morrison

Bibliography
 1988 - Krappe herinnering
 1988 - Vrouwentongen. Verhalen, essays en reisreportages (works of 11 Flemish female writers, composed by Veerle Weverbergh)
 1989 - Stampvoeten in het donker (verhalen)
 1991 - Droomjager (verhalen)
 1994 - Land van Belofte (verhalen)
 1995 - Verzamelde werken

See also
 Flemish literature

Sources

 Rita Demeester in de Digitale Bibliotheek voor de Nederlandse Letteren

1946 births
1993 deaths
People from Roeselare
Flemish writers
KU Leuven alumni
20th-century Belgian women writers
20th-century Belgian writers
Flemish women writers